Jeanette Mundt (born 1982) is an American painter, best known for her works in the 2019 Whitney Biennial.

Early life 
Mundt was born in Princeton, New Jersey, but grew up in Zurich, Switzerland.

Personal life 
Mundt currently resides in the Somerset section of Franklin Township, Somerset County, New Jersey.

Career

Style 
Many of Mundt's recent work which captures the small movements within gymnastic sequences is stylistically reminiscent of Eadweard Muybridge, who was well known for his pieces consisting of photographic series of motion. She is known for taking photographic images and painting them in a fragmented distortion. Mundt described this approach in detail in a 2012 interview with Amanda Palmer in BOMB that coincided with a solo show at Los Angeles's Michael Benevento Gallery. Mundt explained that "for the living room series of four paintings I worked with shifts in size and source. The first painting is 9 × 12 and painted from the photographic source, and the next is 16 × 20 and painted from the painting of the photographic source. The third is 9 × 12 again and painted from the preceding painting, and the last is 16 × 20, painted from the preceding painting."

Themes 
In her Whitney Biennial paintings, Mundt addresses the issues of corruption within the Olympic Committee, the sport of gymnastics, and the media depictions of the sport.   The concepts of forced femininity, nationalism, and gender are incorporated into many of her pieces. She began her series of works revolving around the 2016 U.S. Women's Olympic gymnastics team before the scandal of the sexual abuse of many women under the care of Dr. Larry Nassar became known to the public; however, Mundt encourages viewers to contemplate the implications of the events upon reflecting on her paintings.

In a 2015 interview in Interview, Mundt addressed the idea of the lone artist in society. "I’m not sure it’s possible to be a lone artist anymore what with the internet," she said. "And certainly not if you are ambitious."

Work

Public exhibitions

References 

1982 births
Living people
Painters from New Jersey
People from Franklin Township, Somerset County, New Jersey
People from Princeton, New Jersey
Artists from Zürich